On May 31, 2016, Taliban insurgents posing as government officials kidnapped around 220 civilians at a fake checkpoint along the Kunduz-Takhar highway near Arzaq Angor Bagh in Kunduz province, Afghanistan, on the outskirts of the city of Kunduz. More hostages were killed and kidnapped on June 8.

Events
The civilians were kidnapped from four buses, three vans, and three cars while travelling on the highway. Most of the passengers were eventually released, but at least seventeen have been killed, and at least eighteen (some sources say "around 20") are still being held hostage. Some of the hostages were killed on the spot, and some were killed after they were transported to the village of Omarkhel in Char Dara.

A rescue mission for the eighteen or more civilians was launched. The Afghan Armed Forces rescued many of the passengers, though some soldiers were also taken hostage. Six people were killed after trying to escape when the security forces arrived.

On June 8, 2016, at least 12 hostages being held were executed, and 10 were released.  Another 40 were kidnapped on the same day.

Four people were killed and two more kidnapped after another connected event in Uruzgan Province. Over 250 members of the Taliban claimed to be involved. Other groups were also possibly involved.

Related incidents 
Soon after the attack, four suicide bombers attacked a courthouse in Ghazni, killing at least nine people, and themselves, and injuring 13. Six days before the attack, 11 were killed on a court minibus attack, soon after the death of Mullah Akhtar Mansour. All of these attacks have been conducted by the Taliban. The Taliban held Kunduz briefly one year before the attack.

See also
List of Islamist terrorist attacks
List of terrorist incidents, January–June 2016
List of hostage crises

Notes 
1.It has not been confirmed whether or not six "attackers" that were killed for running away were actually attackers or not.

References 

2016 murders in Afghanistan
Mass murder in 2016
Taliban attacks
Terrorist incidents in Afghanistan in 2016
War in Afghanistan (2001–2021)
May 2016 crimes in Asia
June 2016 crimes in Asia
Hostage taking in Afghanistan